This is a chronological list of England Test wicket-keepers. The list comprises players who were the designated wicket-keeper at the toss, so the number of matches does not include times when a player has acted as a stand-in keeper, or appeared as a batsman only.

Alan Knott kept wicket in 95 Test matches for England, and is currently the record-holder, both in terms of caps as wicket keeper, and dismissals. Godfrey Evans is the record-holder for stumpings. A number of the players listed have played a large number of Test matches as specialist batsmen, for example Jonny Bairstow has played 74 Tests in total, as of January 2021.

On occasions, another player has stepped in to relieve the primary wicket-keeper due to injury or illness. Unless the relief player was himself a recognised Test wicket-keeper, he is not included here. The list also does not include Billy Murdoch, who kept in the second innings of his only Test for England, having previously appeared as wicket-keeper in one of his 18 Tests for Australia. He and Jonny Bairstow are the only replacement keepers to make a stumping for England. Eight stand-in keepers have taken a total of ten catches as replacements, including two by Jonny Bairstow.

On one occasion in 1986, two replacement wicket-keepers were called on, neither of whom were members of the side, and one was a member of the crowd. Former England keeper, Bob Taylor, aged 45 and retired from professional cricket, stepped in at a Test match to replace Bruce French, with the permission of the New Zealand captain, after French had been hit in the head while batting. Later, Hampshire's Bobby Parks, (son of former England wicket keeper Jim Parks) who did not otherwise make a Test appearance in his career, took over from Taylor for the rest of the match.

Statistics are correct as of 11 December 2021.

Source:

See also
 List of English Test cricketers

Notes
Selby appeared in four further Tests as a fielder, taking no catches.
MacGregor appeared in one further Test as a fielder, taking no catches.
Moon appeared in three further Tests as a fielder, taking three catches.
Strudwick appeared in one further Test as a fielder, taking no catches.
Smith appeared in one further Test as a fielder, taking one catch.
Ames appeared in three further Tests as a fielder, taking two catches.
Gibb appeared in five further Tests as a fielder, taking no catches.
Griffith appeared in one further Test as a fielder, taking no catches.
McIntyre appeared in one further Test as a fielder, taking one catch.
Parks appeared in three further Tests as a fielder, taking two catches.
Murray appeared in one further Test as a fielder, taking no catches.
Stewart appeared in 51 further Tests as a fielder, taking 36 catches.
Bairstow has appeared in 29 further Tests as a fielder, taking 10 catches. He stood in as wicket-keeper for Foakes and Buttler in six of these games, taking two catches and one stumping; and 19 catches respectively.
Buttler has appeared in 20 further Tests as a fielder, taking 23 catches. He stood in as wicket-keeper for Bairstow in one of these games.
Pope has appeared in 19 further Tests as a fielder, taking 19 catches.

References

 England wicket-keepers

England wicket-keepers
Australian
English
Wicket-keepers